Stowe is a census-designated place (CDP) comprising the central community in the town of Stowe, Lamoille County, Vermont, United States. As of the 2010 census the population of the CDP was 495, out of 4,314 in the entire town.

Geography
Stowe village is in the eastern part of the town of Stowe, along the Little River where it is joined by the West Branch. Vermont Route 100 passes through the village, leading north  to Morrisville and south  to Waterbury and Interstate 89. Vermont Route 108 has its southern terminus in Stowe village and leads north through Smugglers Notch  to Jeffersonville. 

Via the Little River, Stowe is part of the Winooski River watershed draining westward to Lake Champlain.

References

Census-designated places in Vermont
 Stowe
Census-designated places in Lamoille County, Vermont